Johan Anton Bovin (26 March 1823 – 11 June 1894) was a Swedish jurist and member of parliament.

Bovin was born on 26 March 1823 in Bladåker, Uppsala County, Sweden, to Johan Jakob Bovin and Kristina Gustafva Forsberg. He was mayor of the town of Sala from 1859 and district chief of Hedemora domsaga (Hedemora domsaga) from 1871 to 1889. He was a member of parliament in the bourgeoisie for the city of Sala in 1862/63 and for the city of Sala, the city of Hedemora and the city of Eskilstuna in 1865/66. After the representation reform, he was a member of the Andra kammaren from 1867 to 1872, and was elected to the Arboga och Sala valkrets. He was also chairman of the municipal council and county councilor.

Sources
 Förteckning å vällofliga Borgareståndets ledamöter vid lagtima riksdagen i Stockholm år 1865, borgarståndets protokoll 21/10 1865
 Johan Anton Bovin i Albin Hildebrand, Svenskt porträttgalleri (1913), volym XXVI. Register

References

1853 births
1926 deaths
19th-century Swedish politicians
Swedish jurists
Members of the Riksdag
People from Uppsala Municipality
Swedish people of Belgian descent